God, Sex & Apple Pie is a 1998 film directed by Paul Leaf.

External links
 
 

1998 films
1998 comedy-drama films
1990s English-language films